Leung Yuk Wing (born 13 December 1984) is a Hong Kong boccia player. He competed for Hong Kong at the Summer Paralympics. He won two gold medals at the 2004 Summer Paralympics. He won a silver medal four years later at the 2008 Summer Paralympics in Beijing. He also competed at the 2012 Summer Paralympics. At the 2016 Summer Paralympics, he won a gold medal. At the 2020 Summer Paralympics, he won a bronze medal in the individual event and a silver medal in the pairs event.

References 

1984 births
Living people
Paralympic medalists in boccia
Boccia players at the 2004 Summer Paralympics
Boccia players at the 2008 Summer Paralympics
Boccia players at the 2012 Summer Paralympics
Boccia players at the 2016 Summer Paralympics
Boccia players at the 2020 Summer Paralympics
Medalists at the 2004 Summer Paralympics
Medalists at the 2008 Summer Paralympics
Medalists at the 2016 Summer Paralympics
Medalists at the 2020 Summer Paralympics
Paralympic boccia players of Hong Kong
Paralympic gold medalists for Hong Kong
Paralympic silver medalists for Hong Kong
Paralympic bronze medalists for Hong Kong